Cleobulia is a genus of flowering plants in the legume family, Fabaceae. It belongs to the subfamily Faboideae.

References

External links 

Phaseoleae
Fabaceae genera